The 2021 Open Sud de France is a tennis tournament played on indoor hard courts. It is the 34th edition of the event, and part of the ATP Tour 250 series of the 2021 ATP Tour. It takes place at the Arena Montpellier in Montpellier, France, from February 22 to February 28, 2021.

Champions

Singles 

  David Goffin def.  Roberto Bautista Agut, 5–7, 6–4, 6–2.

Doubles 

  Henri Kontinen /  Édouard Roger-Vasselin def.  Jonathan Erlich /  Andrei Vasilevski, 6–2, 7–5.

Points and prize money

Point distribution

Prize money 

*per team

Singles main-draw entrants

Seeds 

 1 Rankings are as of February 8, 2021.

Other entrants 
The following players received wildcards into the singles main draw:
  Benjamin Bonzi 
  Hugo Gaston
  Andy Murray

The following players received entry from the qualifying draw:
  Grégoire Barrère
  Peter Gojowczyk
  Tallon Griekspoor
  Bernabé Zapata Miralles

Withdrawals
  Pablo Carreño Busta → replaced by  Dennis Novak
  Kyle Edmund → replaced by  Gilles Simon
  Richard Gasquet → replaced by  Sebastian Korda
  Filip Krajinović → replaced by  Jiří Veselý
  Nick Kyrgios → replaced by  Norbert Gombos
  Feliciano López → replaced by  Mikael Ymer
  Reilly Opelka → replaced by  Marcos Giron

ATP doubles main-draw entrants

Seeds 

1 Rankings as of January 25, 2021.

Other entrants 
The following pairs received wildcards into the doubles main draw:
  David Goffin /  Lucas Pouille
  Fabrice Martin /  Gilles Simon

The following pair received entry into the main draw using a protected ranking:
  Dušan Lajović /  Marc López

References

External links